The Synagogue in Bershad, Vinnytsia Oblast in Ukraine, was built at the begin of the 19th century. It is one of the very few synagogues in Ukraine that was neither destroyed during World War II nor closed by the Soviet authorities in the years after the war. It is still used by the small Jewish community of Bershad. It is not to be confused with the magnificent Great Synagogue, which does no longer exist.

Architecture 
The walls of the synagogue are wattle and daub and white-washed, looking like a common rural building.

The synagogue has two main rooms: the men's prayer hall and a western room, which is 2-tired and contains the women's section and perhaps living quarters. An inner wall separates the two rooms.

There are eight wooden columns that support the two large wooden beams of the ceiling. The columns divide the space of the prayer hall into three naves. The Bimah has a simple, square, wooden construction. It is surrounded by four round wooden columns, sits in the centre of the prayer hall and is elevated by one step. Above it on the ceiling is a large Star of David. The Holy Ark, a carved wooden closet, is situated on the western wall. There is no niche for the Tora Ark.

See also 
 List of synagogues in Ukraine

References

External links 
 http://www.eylonconsulting.com/bukovina/blog/?p=907 Pictures; many inside. Retrieved February 22, 2019.
 http://twotzaddiks.org/part4.html Pictures; inside and outside.  Retrieved February 22, 2019.

Synagogues in Ukraine
19th-century synagogues